Lynn, Pennsylvania can refer to the following places in the U.S. commonwealth of Pennsylvania:

 Lynn, Susquehanna County, Pennsylvania, an historic community now part of Springville in Susquehanna County 
 Lynn Township, Lehigh County, Pennsylvania, a township in Lehigh County, Pennsylvania